Andrey Nikolayevich Mordvichev (born 14 January 1976) is a Russian lieutenant general who is the overall commander of the Central Military District.

Mordvichev commanded the 4th Separate Guards Tank Brigade from 2011 and the 28th Separate Motor Rifle Brigade in 2014. Now the commander of the Central Military district.

2022 Invasion of Ukraine

He commanded the army during the 2022 Russian invasion of Ukraine, where Ukrainian sources (falsely) claimed he was killed in an 18 March airstrike on an airfield in Chornobaivka. This would have made him Russia's sixth general to be killed in the invasion and the most highly ranked casualty of the war up to that point. However, Mordvichev's claimed death was not confirmed by Russian sources, and on 28 March, Russian television broadcast images that showed Ramzan Kadyrov meeting Mordvichev in Mariupol.

Since 17 February 2023, he has commanded Russia's Central Military District, having replaced the promoted Colonel-General Aleksandr Lapin due to the previous territorial losses during the 2022 Kharkiv counteroffensive.

References 

Russian lieutenant generals
Recipients of the Order of Military Merit (Russia)
Possibly living people
1974 births